Acceleration Team Venezuela is the Venezuelan team of Formula Acceleration 1, an international racing series. They are run by the RC Motorsport team, owned by Rocco Peduzzi and E. Catella.

History

2014 season 
Drivers: Rodolfo González

The team announced Rodolfo Gonzalez as their driver for the inaugural Formula Acceleration 1 season.

Drivers

Complete Formula Acceleration 1 Results

References 

Venezuela
A
Sports teams in Venezuela